In the fifth season of the Balkan International Basketball League, twelve participants from the Republic of Macedonia, Bulgaria, Serbia, Montenegro, Israel, Croatia and the new represented country Greece has competed.

Teams

Format

First round
In the first round the teams were divided into two groups, each containing five teams. Each team played every other team in its group at home and away. The three teams that finished at the top of their group advanced to second round (or Group C). The teams that finished fourth and fifth in their group advanced to another group (or Group D).

The opening game has been played on October 16, 2012 and the last match day was played on January 15, 2013.

Second round
The six teams, qualified for group C, kept the results between them from the first stage and played with the three teams from the other group home and away games. The first four teams in the final standing in group C qualified for the Final Four.

The four teams, qualified for group D, also kept the results between them from the first stage and played with the two teams from the other group home and away games.

The first game was played on January 22, 2013 and the last match day was played on April 3, 2013.

Final four
The four remaining teams played a semifinal match and the winners of those advanced to the final. The losers played in a third-place playoff. The dates of the Final Four were April 19 and 21, 2013.

First round

Group A

Group B

Second round

Group C

Group D

Final four

External links
 BIBL official webpage
 Balkan League standings and livescores

2012–13
2012–13 in European basketball leagues
2012–13 in Serbian basketball
2012–13 in Republic of Macedonia basketball
2012–13 in Greek basketball
2012–13 in Bulgarian basketball
2012–13 in Montenegrin basketball
2012–13 in Croatian basketball
2012–13 in Israeli basketball